Count Christian of Rosenborg  (Christian Frederik Franz Knud Harald Carl Oluf Gustav Georg Erik; 22 October 1942 – 21 May 2013) was a member of the Danish royal family.  Born Prince Christian of Denmark, he was high in the line of succession until the constitution was changed in 1953 to allow females to inherit the crown, placing his branch of the dynasty behind that of his cousin Margrethe and her two younger sisters.  He later gave up his princely rank and his rights to the throne in order to marry a commoner.

Family
He was born at Sorgenfri Palace, Sorgenfri, as the younger son of Hereditary Prince Knud by his wife and first cousin, Princess Caroline-Mathilde of Denmark.

Loss of place in succession

From the death of his grandfather in 1947, Christian stood only behind his father and elder brother Prince Ingolf in the order of hereditary succession to the throne, with only future children of Ingolf possibly taking a place ahead of him. His father Prince Knud was then the heir presumptive, due to succeed Christian's uncle King Frederick IX, who had three daughters but no sons.

In 1953, the Constitution of Denmark was amended to allow cognatic primogeniture. The new law made thirteen-year-old Princess Margrethe the new heir presumptive, placing her and her two sisters before Prince Knud and his family in the succession.  Christian was thus relegated to sixth in the line of succession to the Danish throne, but more importantly, he then ranked behind Margrethe and others who were likely to have dynastic children of their own (as has, in fact, happened).  The princess became Queen Margrethe II in 1972 and is still reigning.  Christian's place in the line of succession, if he had been still eligible, would have been no higher than thirteenth in 2013.

Marriage, loss of dynastic rights and children
By 1971, Princess Margrethe had produced two children, pushing Christian to 8th in the line of succession. He then chose to forfeit his right of succession to the throne by marrying without having received the royal assent of the monarch in the Council of State.  His brother Ingolf had done the same three years previously.

The king's permission to marry was not sought because it was expected to be denied, since Christian's fiancée was an untitled commoner. Though Frederick IX had liberalized traditional practice by allowing royal spouses who were not themselves royal, but who claimed noble blood and were known by courtesy titles (Anne Bowes-Lyon was the granddaughter of an earl, first cousin of Queen Elizabeth II, and through her first marriage to the son of an earl bore the title of viscountess; Henri de Laborde de Monpezat used the title of count, though his family's claim to nobility was later acknowledged to be flawed), it would not be until 1995 that Margrethe II would allow her children to marry commoners with neither title nor claim to noble blood. Christian was given the title count of Rosenborg and the style of Excellency, as was customary in the twentieth century for Danish princes who renounced or forfeited their dynastic rights.

Prior to his elder son's wedding in 1968, Prince Knud sought to convince his brother that Ingolf should be allowed to retain his royal title after his non-dynastic marriage, a privilege which might have been subsequently extended to Christian. But the king refused, on the grounds that other males of the dynasty, who had been demoted to counts of Rosenborg upon marriage, might try to re-claim their royal rank if Ingolf were allowed to do so despite his marrying a commoner as they had done. So, in 1971, Christian renounced his rights to the throne and took the title count of Rosenborg.

On 27 February 1971, at Lyngby, Denmark, Christian married Anne Dorte Maltoft-Nielsen (3 October 1947 in Frederikssund – 2 January 2014 in Copenhagen) who thus became Her Excellency Countess Anne Dorte of Rosenborg. Although lacking the prior royal assent of the monarch given in the Council of State that the law required, the king expressed no personal opposition to his nephew's choice of bride and, according to Christian, the king's private consent later had to be formally registered by the King-in-Council. In a 1985 interview with Billed-Bladet, Count Christian had explained (translated from Danish):
As protocol dictates, I had to ask my uncle, King Frederick IX, if he had any objections to my getting engaged...I knew I would have to renounce my title of prince and my right of succession if I married her. I was number four in the line of succession after Princess Margrethe, Princess Benedikte, and my father. My brother, Ingolf, had two years previously lost his princely title and succession right when he married a commoner, Countess Inge. Now I was ready to follow him. To me, it didn't matter if I were in line for the throne or not...My uncle, of course, had nothing against a union between Anne Dorte and me.

Count Christian and Countess Anne Dorte had three daughters: twins Josephine and Camilla (born in 1972) and Feodora (born in 1975). All three were Countesses from birth but lost their titles with their non-dynastic marriages.

Public life
Count Christian took part in some major public events associated with the royal family, in 2004, he and Countess Anne Dorte attended the wedding on 14 May 2004 of Crown Prince Frederik at Copenhagen Cathedral, Copenhagen and the subsequent reception at Fredensborg Palace. They also attended the Memorial Service in honour of Empress Maria Feodorovna of Russia held on 22 September 2006. They were included in the official guest-list as members of the Danish Royal Family when they attended the luncheon to celebrate the 75th birthday of Prince Henrik at Fredensborg Palace on 11 June 2009; and the ruby jubilee celebrations for Queen Margrethe.

Death
Count Christian died on 21 May 2013 (aged 70) at Gentofte Hospital, Copenhagen in Denmark. A number of members of the Danish royal family, led by Queen Margrethe, attended Count Christian's funeral, held at Lyngby Church on 29 May 2013. His wife Countess Anne Dorte of Rosenborg died just 7 months later on 2 January 2014 in Copenhagen.

Ancestry

References

Citations

Bibliography 

 

Danish princes
1942 births
2013 deaths
House of Glücksburg (Denmark)
Counts of Rosenborg
Disinherited European royalty